Lochiel may refer to:

Places

Scotland
Loch Eil, a sea loch in the home area of Clan Cameron, sometimes referred to as Lochiel
Lochiel, Scotland, a historic place on Loch Eil that was home to Donald Cameron of Lochiel, the 19th Lochiel

United States
Lochiel, Arizona, a ghost town in southern Santa Cruz County
Lochiel, Indiana
Lochiel, Pennsylvania
Lochiel, Wisconsin, the original name of Wheeler

Elsewhere
Lochiel, South Australia
Lochiel, Mpumalanga, South Africa

Other uses
Lochiel (Clan Cameron chief), any of the Clan Cameron leaders, in Scotland
, a MacBrayne mail steamer employed on the route to Islay from the 1930s to the 1970s.

See also
Lochiel Park, an historic house and park in the City of Campbelltown, South Australia